USS United States may refer to:

 was one of the original six frigates that served from 1798 until 1865.
USS United States (CC-6) was a  canceled and scrapped when the vessel was only 12 percent complete.
 was an aircraft carrier canceled five days after her keel was laid down in 1949. The ship would have been the lead ship under the United States-class aircraft carrier.
 USS United States was to be the eighth Nimitz-class aircraft carrier but renamed  in 1995.

See also
 SS United States
 USS America

United States Navy ship names